James Bannon (born 6 March 1958) is a former Irish Fine Gael politician who served as a Teachta Dála (TD) for the Longford–Westmeath constituency from 2007 to 2016. He was a Senator for the Industrial and Commercial Panel from 2002 to 2007.

A native of Legan, County Longford, he worked as a farmer and auctioneer before entering politics.

He was first elected to Longford County Council at the 1985 local elections for the Ballymahon local electoral area, and was successively re-elected to the County Council at the 1991 and 1999 local elections, receiving the largest number of first-preference votes in the electoral area on each occasion. He has served as Chairperson of Longford County Council, becoming the youngest person ever to do so.

In 2002, he was elected to Seanad Éireann as a Fine Gael candidate for the Industrial and Commercial Panel. He stood down as a member of Longford County Council when legislation was introduced prohibiting serving members of the Oireachtas from being members of local authorities, and was succeeded by his brother, Larry. He was first elected to Dáil Éireann at the 2007 general election for Longford–Westmeath.

He served as the party deputy Spokesperson on Environment, with special responsibility for Heritage from 2007 to 2010. In October 2010, he was appointed as deputy spokesperson on Environment with special responsibility for Local and Community Development.

In 2012, he asked Bishop Colm O'Reilly to reconsider selecting an Italian organ maker to rebuild the organ in St Mel's Cathedral in Longford.

During campaigning ahead of the 2016 general election, Gardaí gave Bannon a lift after he became involved in a dispute while canvassing in the Creevaghbeg estate area in Ballymahon, County Longford. An associate of Bannon was reported to have stolen election leaflets belonging to a rival candidate from local letter boxes.

He lost his seat at the 2016 general election. He subsequently failed to gain re-election to Seanad Éireann in April 2016.

References

 

1958 births
Living people
Fine Gael TDs
Irish auctioneers
20th-century Irish farmers
Local councillors in County Longford
Members of the 22nd Seanad
Members of the 30th Dáil
Members of the 31st Dáil
Fine Gael senators
21st-century Irish farmers